At the 2006 Winter Paralympics, the ice sledge hockey events were contested at the Torino Esposizioni.

Medalists

Qualification

Team rosters

Preliminary round
All times are local (UTC+1).

Group A

Group B

Classification round

Bracket

5–8th place semifinals

Seventh place game

Fifth place game

Medal round

Bracket

Semifinals

Bronze medal game

Gold medal game

Statistics

Scoring leaders
List shows the top ten skaters sorted by points, then goals.

GP = Games played; G = Goals; A = Assists; Pts = Points; +/− = Plus/minus; PIM = Penalties in minutes; POS = PositionSource: Torino 2006

Leading goaltenders
Only the top five goaltenders, based on save percentage, who have played at least 40% of their team's minutes, are included in this list.
TOI = Time on ice (minutes:seconds); GA = Goals against; GAA = Goals against average; SA = Shots against; Sv% = Save percentage; SO = Shutouts

Awards
Most Valuable Player:  Rolf Einar Pedersen
Best players selected by the directorate:
Best Goaltender:  Rolf Rabe
Best Defenceman:  Rolf Einar Pedersen
Best Forward:  Billy Bridges
Source: Torino 2006

References

External links
Results book

2006 Winter Paralympics events
Paralympics, Winter
2006